In Shi'a Islam the guidance of clergy and keeping such a structure holds a great importance. The clergy structure depends on the branch of Shi'ism is being referred to.

Twelver 

Usooli and Akhbari Shia Twelver Muslims believe that the study of Islamic literature is a continual process, and is necessary for identifying all of God's laws. Twelver Shia Muslims believe that the process of finding God's laws from the available Islamic literature will facilitate in dealing with any circumstance. They believe that they can interpret the Qur'an and the Twelver Shi'a traditions with the same authority as their predecessors. This process of ijtihad has provided a means to deal with current issues from an Islamic perspective. Generally, clergy in Twelver Shi'a have exerted much more authority in their religious   community than the Sunni ulema in theirs.

Usooli Shia considering it obligatory to obey a mujtahid when seeking to determine Islamically correct behavior. They believe the 12th Imam, ordered them to follow the scholars (Fuqaha) who: "...guard their soul, protect their religion, and follow the commandments of their master (Allah)..." The mujtahid they follow or emulate is known as a Marja' Taqleedi. As of 2014 there were over 60 recognized Marj in the Shia Muslim world.

Historical role in politics and society

Modern history 
The Shia clerics in this period were closely tied with the bazaars that were in turn strongly linked with the artisans and farmers that together formed traditional socioeconomic communities and centers of associational life with Islamic occasions and functions tying them to clerics who interpreted Islamic laws to settle commercial disputes and taxed the well-to-do to provide welfare for devout poorer followers. A succession of prayer-meetings and rituals were organized by both clergy and the laity. Bazaars also enjoyed ties with more modern sectors of Iranians society as many Iranian university students were from the merchant class. But since 1970s, the Shah of Iran aroused the defense and oppositions of the bazaar by attempts at bring under control their autonomous councils and marginalizing the clergy by taking over their educational and welfare activities.  This combined with the growing public and clerical dissatisfaction with Shah's secular policies and his reliance on foreign powers particularly the United States, led to a nationwide revolution, that saw a high ranking cleric Ayatollah Khomeini and his clerical disciples as its top leadership, that deposed the Pahlavi Shah and founded the Islamic Republic of Iran.

Ismaili 
The Imamate in Nizārī Ismā'īlī doctrine (Arabic: إمامة) is a concept in Nizari Isma'ilism which defines the political, religious and spiritual dimensions of authority concerning Islamic leadership over the nation of believers. The primary function of the Imamate is to establish an institution between an Imam who is present and living in the world and his following whereby each is granted rights and responsibilities. See also Imamate in Nizari doctrine for further information.

The term Dāʻī al-Mutlaq literally means "the absolute or unrestricted missionary". In Ismā'īlī Islām, the term dāʻī has been used to refer to important religious leaders other than the hereditary Imāms and the Daʻwa or "Mission" is a clerical-style organization. "The Daʻwa" was a term for the Ismā'īlī faith itself from early on. The Dāʻīs are also called Syednas. See Musta'li and Taiyabi for further information. List of Dai of Dawoodi Bohra

Contemporary scholars

Afghanistan 
Ali Mohaqiq Nasab
Asif Mohseni
Muhammad al-Fayadh
Mohaqiq Kabuli

Azerbaijan 
Allahshukur Pashazadeh

Bahrain 
Abdul Amir al-Jamri
Ali Salman
Isa Qassim

India 
Ali Naqi Naqvi
Syed Ali Nasir Saeed Abaqati
Aga Syed Yusuf Al-Moosavi Al-Safavi
Syed Aqeel-ul-Gharavi
Syed Hamidul Hasan
Hasan Naqvi
Syed Kalbe Hussain
Kalbe Jawad
Mirza Mohammed Athar
Aga Syed Mohammad Fazlullah
Sheikh Mussa Shariefi
Aga Syed Mustafa Moosavi
Syed Ali Akhtar Rizvi
Syed Saif Abbas Naqvi
Syed Zafrul Hasan Rizvi
Zeeshan Haider Jawadi

Iran 

Abbas Ali Akhtari
Abbas-Ali Amid Zanjani

Abbas-Ali Soleimani
Abbas Amirifar
Abbas Hosseini Kashani
Abbas Ka'bi
Abbas Mahfouzi

Abbas Almohri
Mohammad Montazeri

Seyed Abbas Mousavi Motlagh
Abbas Tabrizian
Abbas Vaez-Tabasi
Abdul Fattah Nawab

Abdol Hossein Dastgheib
Abdul Hussein Mo'ezzi
Abdol Javad Alamolhoda

Abdul Karim Farhani
Abdolkarim Hasheminejad
Abdul Karim Haghshenas
Abdul-Karim Mousavi Ardebili
Seyyed Abdollah Fateminia

Abd al-A'la al-Sabziwari
Abdollah Javadi-Amoli
Abdullah Musawi Shirazi
Abdollah Nouri

Abdul-Majid al-Khoei

Abdolmoghim Nasehi
Abdul-Nabi Mousavi Fard
Abdul-Nabi Namazi
Ayatollah Abdul Rahman Heidari Ilami

Abdolvahed Mousavi Lari

Seyed Abolfazl Mousavi Tabrizi

Abulhassan Navab
Abolghasem Khazali

Abu al-Qasim al-Khoei
Abolghasem Wafi Yazdi

Ahmad Alamolhoda
Ahmad Azari Qomi
Ahmad Beheshti

Ahmad Hosseini Khorasani
Ahmad Jannati
Ahmad Khatami
Ahmad Khomeini
Ahmad Khonsari
Ahmad Marvi
Ahmad Mazani
Ahmad Moballeghi
Ahmad Mohseni Garakani
Ahmad Mojtahedi Tehrani

Ahmad Ghabel
Mir Ahmad Reza Hajati
Seyyed Ahmad Reza Shahrokhi

Ahmad Salek
Ahmad Vaezi

Akbar Hashemi Rafsanjani

Ali Akbar al-Modarresi
Ali Meshkini
Ali-Akbar Hosseini

Ali Akbar Masoudi Khomeini
Ali Akbar Mohtashamipur

Ali Akbar Ghoreishi

 
Ali Akbar Nategh-Nouri
Ali Akbar Rashad
Ali al-Sabziwari

Seyed Ali Asghar Dastgheib

Ali Asghar Rahimi Azad
Ali Asghar Rahmani Khalili
Ali Banaei
Ali Fallahian
Ali Davani

Ali Golzadeh Ghafouri

Ali al-Sistani

Ali Khamenei

Ali Mohammad Dastgheib Shirazi

Ali Orumian
Ali Qazi Askar
Ali Qoddusi

Alireza Arafi

Alireza Panahian
Alireza Qaeminia
Alireza Salimi (politician)
Ali Safi Golpaygani
Seyyed Ali Shafiei
Ali Shirazi

Asadollah Bayat-Zanjani
Assad-Allah Imani

Mir Asadollah Madani
Asgar Dirbaz
Ataollah Ashrafi Esfahani
Azizollah Khoshvaght

Fakhreddin Mousavi
 

Gholam Ali Safai Bushehri
Mohammad Mohammadi Golpayegani
Gholam-Hossein Mohseni-Eje'i

Gholamreza Hassani
Gholamreza Mesbahi Moghaddam
Gholamreza Rezvani

Habibollah Ashouri

Habib Boromand Dashghapu
Hadi al-Modarresi

Hadi Khamenei
Hadi Khosroshahi
Hadi Ghabel
Hadi Ghaffari
Hadi Rohani
Hamid Rasai
Hamid Shahriari
Mirza Hashem Amoli
Hashem Bathaie Golpayegani

Hashem Hashemzadeh Herisi
Hashem Hosseini Bushehri

Hasanali Morvarid
Hasan Ali Nejabat Shirazi
Hassan Ameli
Hassan Emami
Hassan Hassanzadeh Amoli
Hassan Eslami Ardakani
Hassan Khomeini

Hassan Namazi

Hassan Rouhani
Hassan Sanei

Hassan Tabatabaei Qomi

Heydar Moslehi
Hussein-Ali Montazeri

Hossein Borujerdi
Hossein Ansarian

Hossein Ayatollahi

Hossein Kazemeyni Boroujerdi
Hossein Lankarani
Hossein Mazaheri

Hossein Mousavi Tabrizi
Hossein Noori Hamedani

Hossein Taeb
Hossein Wahid Khorasani
Ebrahim Amini
Mir Ebrahim Seyyed Hatami
Ebrahim Raisi

Esmaeil Khatib
Seyed Esmaeil Mousavi Zanjani

Jafar Sobhani
Jafar Shojouni
Jalaleddin Taheri

Javad Gharavi Aliari

Javad Khamenei
Jawad Tabrizi
Javad Mojtahed Shabestari

Karamatollah Malek-Hosseini
Khalil Boyukzadeh
Khalil Mobasher Kashani
Seyed Kazem Seyed Bagheri

Kazem Nourmofidi
Kazem Seddiqi
Lotfollah Dezhkam
Lotfollah Safi Golpaygani
Mahmoud Taleghani
Mahmoud Alavi

Mahmoud Hashemi Shahroudi

Mahmoud Mar'ashi Najafi

Mahmoud Nabavian

Mahmoud Salavati
Mahdi al-Modarresi

Mahdi Hosseini Rohani
Mehdi Karroubi

Seyed Mehdi Ghoreishi
Mehdi Shabzendedar Jahromi

Majid Ansari

Mansour Leghaei
Masoud Khamenei
Ali Younesi

Mohammad-Ali Abtahi
Mohammad Ali Ale-Hashem
Mohammad-Ali Angaji
Mohammad Ali Araki

Mohammad Ali Gerami Qomi

Mohammad Alavi Gorgani
Mohammad Ali Esmaeelpoor Ghomsheie

Mohammad Ali Mousavi Jazayeri

Ali Movahedi-Kermani
Mohammad Ali Qazi Tabatabaei
Mohammad-Ali Rahmani

Mohammad-Ali Shahidi 

Mohammad Ali Shomali
Mohammad-Ali Taskhiri

Mohammad-Bagher Bagheri

Mohammad Bagher Kharazi

Mohammed Emami-Kashani

Mohammad Fazel Lankarani
Mohammad Feyz Sarabi

Mohammad Hadi Ghazanfari Khansari

Mohammad-Hassan Aboutorabi Fard
Mohammad Hassan Ahmadi Faqih

Mohammad Hassan Ghadrdan Gharamaleki
Mohammad Hassan Rahimian

Mohammad Beheshti

Mohammad Hussaini Shahroudi

Seyyed Mohammad Hosseini Zanjani
Muhammad Husayn Tabatabai

Mohammad Ebrahim Jannaati

Mohammad Ezodin Hosseini Zanjani

Mohammad Jafar Montazeri
Muhammad Jafar Moravej
Muhammad Javad Haj Ali Akbari
Mohammad-Javad Bahonar
Mohammad Javad Pishvai

Mohammed Kadhim al-Modarresi
Mohammad Kazem Shariatmadari
Mohammad Khamenei
Mohammad Khatami

Mehdi Tabatabaei
Mohammad Mofatteh

Mohammad Mohammadi Gilani
Mohammad Momen
Mohammad Mousavi Khoeiniha
Mohammad Mofti al-shia Mousavi

Nasser Biria
Mohammad Qomi
Mohammad Rahmati Sirjani

Mohammad Reyshahri

Mohammad-Reza Ashtiani Araghi

Mohammad-Reza Golpaygani
Mohammad-Reza Mahdavi Kani

Mohammad Reza Mirtajodini
Mohammad-Reza Modarresi Yazdi
Mohammad Reza Naseri Yazdi
Mohammad Reza Nekoonam
Mohammed Ridha al-Sistani
Mohammad-Reza Tavassoli

Sadegh Khalkhali
Mohammad Sadeq Rouhani
Mohammad-Sadegh Salehimanesh
Mohammad Sadeqi Tehrani
Mohammad Sadoughi
Seyyed Mohammad Saeedi

Mohammad Shahcheraghi
Mohammad-Taher Shubayr al-Khaqani
Mohammad Taqi al-Modarresi
Mohammad Taqi al-Khoei
Mohammad-Taqi Bahjat Foumani
Mohammad Taghi Falsafi
Mohammad-Taqi Ja'fari
Mohammad-Taghi Khalaji
Mohammad-Taqi Mesbah-Yazdi

Mohammed Taqi Morvarid

Mohammad Taghi Pourmohammadi

Mohammad-Taqi Shoushtari
Mohammad Taghi Vaezi

Mohammad Vaez Mousavi

Mohammad Yazdi
Seyyed Mohammad Ziaabadi

Mohsen Araki
Mohsen Faqihi
Mohsen Heidari Alekasir

Mohsen Kharazi
Mohsen Koochebaghi Tabrizi
Mohsen Mojtahed Shabestari
Mohsin Qara'ati
Mohsen Qomi
Mohsen Rohami

Seyed Mojtaba Hosseini
Mujtaba Musavi Lari
Mojtaba Tehrani
Mojtaba Zonnour

Morteza Aghatehrani

Morteza Moghtadai
Morteza Motahhari

Morteza Sadouqi Mazandarani

Mousa Shubairi Zanjani
Mostafa Boroujerdi

Mostafa Khamenei
Mostafa Khomeini
 
Mostafa Mohaghegh Damad
Mostafa Mousavi Faraz
Mostafa Pourmohammadi

Moslem Malakouti

Nasir Hosseini
Nasrollah Pejmanfar
Nasrallah Shah-Abadi
Naser Makarem Shirazi
Seyed Naser Mousavi Largani

Nematollah Salehi Najafabadi

Qasem Ravanbakhsh
Mir Ghesmat Mosavi Asl
Ghodratollah Alikhani

Ghorbanali Dorri-Najafabadi

Rasul Jafarian
Rasoul Montajabnia

Seyed Reza Bahaadini
Reza Hosseini Nassab
Reza Mohammadi Langroudi
Reza Nouri
Reza Ostadi
Reza Ramezani Gilani

Ruhollah Beigi
Ruhollah Hosseinian
Ruhollah Khatami
Ruhollah Khomeini

Sadeq Larijani
Saied Reza Ameli
Seyed Sajjad Izdehi

Shahab ud-Din Mar'ashi Najafi

Taqi Tabatabaei Qomi

Yadollah Duzduzani

Yahya Nouri
Yasubedin Rastegar Jooybari
Yousef Madani Tabrizi
Yousef Saanei
Yousef Tabatabai Nejad

Zaynolabideen Ghorbani

Iraq 

Abbas Modaresi Yazdi
Abdul Aziz al-Hakim
Abd al-Hadi al-Fadli
Abdul Mahdi al-Karbalai

Ahmed Al-Waeli
Ahmad Hassani Baghdadi
Akram al-Kaabi
Al-Sayyed Riyadh Al-Hakeem
Ali al-Hakim
Ali al-Milani
Ali Hassani Baghdadi
Allaedin Ghoraifi
Ammar al-Hakim
Baqir al-Irawani

Fadhil al-Milani
Fazel Maleki

Hassan al-Qazwini
Hassan al-Shirazi
Husham Al-Husainy
Hussein Al-Sadr
Hussein al-Shirazi
Iyad Jamal Al-Din
Jafar al-Hakim
Jalal al-Din Ali al-Saghir

Kamal al-Haydari
Kazem al-Haeri
Mohammad al-Sadr
Muhammad Ali al-Hakim
Mohammad Ali Shirazi
Mohammad Ali Tabatabaei Hassani 
Mohammad Baqir al-Hakim
Mohammad Baqir al-Sadr
Mohammad Hadi al-Milani
Mohammad Ebrahim Ansari
Mohammed Kadhim al-Qazwini
Muhammad Saeed al-Hakim
Mohammad al-Shirazi
Mohammad Taher Khaqani

Mohammad Yaqoobi
Muhsin al-Hakim
Mujtaba al-Shirazi
Murtadha al-Qazwini
Murtadha al-Shirazi
Moustafa Al-Qazwini
Qais Khazali
Qasem Taei
Sadiq al-Shirazi
Saleh Taei
Shamsodin Vaezi

Kuwait 
Muhammad Baqir al-Muhri

Lebanon 
Abbas al-Musawi
Abdel Karim Obeid
Ali Al-Kourani
Hashim Safi Al Din
Hassan Nasrallah
Hossein Korani Ameli
Muhammad Hussein Fadlallah
Mohammad Mehdi Shamseddine
Mohammad Yazbek
Musa al-Sadr
Naim Qassem
Ragheb Harb
Subhi al-Tufayli

Nigeria 
Ibrahim Zakzaky
Qasim Umar Sokoto

Pakistan 
Syed Ali Raza Rizvi
Syed Ali Naqi Naqvi Qumi
Arif Hussain Hussaini
Bashir Hussain Najafi
Fida Hussain Bukhari
Agha Syed Hamid Ali Shah Moosavi
Hafiz Riaz Hussain Najafi
Hassan Raza Ghadeeri
Allama Hassan Turabi
Jawad Naqvi
Muhammad Hussain Najafi
Muhammad Latif Ansari
Nasir al-Din Nasir Hunzai
Syed Safdar Hussain Najafi
Syed Sajid Ali Naqvi
Talib Jauhari
Zeeshan Haider Jawadi

Saudi Arabia 
Nimr al-Nimr

Historical Scholars

See also 
Akhoond
Hawza
Imamzadeh
Islamic scholars
List of Ayatollahs
List of Maraji

Notes

References
Religion and Politics in Iraq. Shiite Clerics between Quietism and Resistance, M. Ismail Marcinkowski.

Shia Islam